Erigeron davisii is a North American species of flowering plant in the family Asteraceae known by the common name Davis's fleabane . It has been found only in Idaho and in northeastern Oregon.

Erigeron davisii is a perennial herb up to 30 cm (12 inches) tall. Each branch generally has only one flower head, with 50–80 white ray florets and numerous yellow disc florets.

References

davisii
Flora of Idaho
Flora of Oregon
Plants described in 1942
Flora without expected TNC conservation status